Veve is a Vodun religious symbol.

Veve may also refer to:

VeVe, Android and iOS digital marketplace application
Veve (film), 1914 Kenyan film
Mount Veve, extinct volcano in Solomon Islands
Vevé (footballer) (1918-1964), Brazilian footballer
VèVè Amasasa Clark (1944-2007), American author and scholar
Joanne Rodríguez Veve (born 1983), Puerto Rican lawyer and politician
Veve Zulfikar (born 2003), Indonesian religious singer and actress

See also
Vevey (disambiguation)
Vevi, Greek village